Kato Milia is a village of the Katerini municipality. Before the 2011 local government reform it was part of the municipality of Petra. The 2011 census recorded 869 inhabitants in the village. Kato Milia is a part of the community of Milia.

See also
 List of settlements in the Pieria regional unit

References

Populated places in Pieria (regional unit)